Pentti Veikko "Loppi" Siltaloppi (29 September 1917 – 18 June 2002) was a Finnish male runner. He competed in the 3000 metres steeplechase at the 1946 European Championships and the 1948 Summer Olympics and finished fifth-sixth.

References

1917 births
2002 deaths
Finnish male long-distance runners
Finnish male steeplechase runners
Olympic athletes of Finland
Athletes (track and field) at the 1948 Summer Olympics
People from Ilmajoki
Sportspeople from South Ostrobothnia